The 1964–65 season was the 19th season in FK Partizan's existence. This article shows player statistics and matches that the club played during the 1964–65 season.

Players

Squad information
player (league matches/league goals)Vladica Kovačević (28/14)Josip Pirmajer (27/7)Ljubomir Mihajlović (26/0)Milan Galić (24/15)Ivan Ćurković (23/0) (goalkeeper)Mustafa Hasanagić (20/13)Radoslav Bečejac (20/2)Jovan Miladinović (19/0)Joakim Vislavski (18/5)Fahrudin Jusufi (18/0)Branko Rašović (17/0)Velibor Vasović (15/0)Velimir Sombolac (14/0)Milan Damjanović (11/0)Milan Vukelić (10/0)Lazar Radović (8/0)Bora Milutinović (6/0)Mane Bajić (5/1)Miodrag Petrović (5/1)Milutin Šoškić (4/0) (goalkeeper)Branislav Mihajlović (2/0)Jovan Ćurčić (1/0) (goalkeeper)Vojislav Simeunović (1/0)

Friendlies

Competitions

Yugoslav First League

Yugoslav Cup

Statistics

Goalscorers 
This includes all competitive matches.

Score overview

See also
 List of FK Partizan seasons

References

External links
 Official website
 Partizanopedia 1964-65  (in Serbian)

FK Partizan seasons
Partizan
Yugoslav football championship-winning seasons